Rigo Coastal Rural LLG is a local-level government (LLG) of Central Province, Papua New Guinea.

Wards
01. Gabagaba
02. Ginigolo
03. Gunugau
04. Tagana
05. Gabone
06. Tauruba
07. Bonanamo
08. Kemabolo
09. Galomarupu
10. Walai
11. Babagarubu
12. Riwalirupu
13. Gemo
14. Kaparoko
15. Irupara
16. Hula
17. Babaka
18. Kamali
19. Kalo
20. Makerupu
21. Alukuni
22. Karawa
23. Keapara

References

Local-level governments of Central Province (Papua New Guinea)